The 2019 US Open was the 139th edition of tennis' US Open and the fourth and final Grand Slam event of the year. It was held on outdoor hard courts at the USTA Billie Jean King National Tennis Center in New York City.

Novak Djokovic and Naomi Osaka were the men's and women's singles defending champions. Neither managed to defend their title, with Djokovic retiring in the fourth round due to a shoulder injury after losing the first two sets against Stan Wawrinka, and Osaka losing in the fourth round against Belinda Bencic.

Serena Williams set an Open Era record by reaching 10 US Open finals.

It was the first time since the 2017 Australian Open and fourth time in the Open Era that both the men's and women's number one seeds were defeated before the quarterfinals.

In a repeat of the 2019 Rogers Cup, Rafael Nadal won the men's singles title, defeating first time Grand Slam finalist Daniil Medvedev in a 5-set thriller for his 19th Grand Slam singles title. Bianca Andreescu won the women's singles title, defeating Serena Williams in straight sets in the final, becoming the first Canadian to win a Grand Slam singles title.

Tournament

The 2019 US Open was the 139th edition of the tournament and took place at the USTA Billie Jean King National Tennis Center in Flushing Meadows–Corona Park of Queens in New York City, New York, United States. The tournament was held on 17 DecoTurf hard courts.

The tournament was an event run by the International Tennis Federation (ITF) and was part of the 2019 ATP Tour and the 2019 WTA Tour calendars under the Grand Slam category. The tournament consisted of both men's and women's singles and doubles draws as well as a mixed doubles event. There were also singles and doubles events for both boys and girls (players under 18), which were part of the Grade A category of tournaments. Additionally, there were singles and doubles wheelchair tennis events for men, women and quads.

The tournament was played on hard courts and took place over a series of 17 courts with DecoTurf surface, including the three existing main showcourts – Arthur Ashe Stadium, Louis Armstrong Stadium, and Grandstand.

Broadcast
In the United States, the 2019 US Open was the fifth year in a row under an 11-year, $825 million contract with ESPN, in which the broadcaster held exclusive rights to the entire tournament and the US Open Series. This meant that the tournament was not available on broadcast television. This also made ESPN the exclusive U.S. broadcaster for three of the four tennis majors.

Point and prize money distribution

Point distribution
Below is a series of tables for each of the competitions showing the ranking points on offer for each event.

Senior

Wheelchair

Junior

Prize money 
The US Open has the richest prize purse of all Grand Slams. The total prize money compensation for the 2019 US Open is $57,238,700, a more than 13.2% increase on the same total last year.

Singles players

Men's singles

Women's singles

Day-by-day summaries

Singles seeds
The following are the seeded players and notable players who have withdrawn from the event. Seedings are based on ATP and WTA rankings as of August 19, 2019. Rank and points before are as of August 26, 2019.

Men's singles

† The player did not qualify for the tournament in 2018, but is defending points from two 2018 ATP Challenger Tour tournaments (Como and Genoa).

The following player would have been seeded, but withdrew before the event.

Women's singles

The following player would have been seeded, but withdrew before the event.

Doubles seeds

Men's doubles

1Rankings as of August 19, 2019.

Women's doubles

1Rankings as of August 19, 2019.

Mixed doubles

1Rankings as of August 19, 2019.

Events

Men's singles

 Rafael Nadal def.  Daniil Medvedev, 7–5, 6–3, 5–7, 4–6, 6–4

Women's singles

  Bianca Andreescu def.  Serena Williams, 6–3, 7–5

Men's doubles

  Juan Sebastián Cabal /  Robert Farah def.  Marcel Granollers /  Horacio Zeballos, 6–4, 7–5

Women's doubles

  Elise Mertens /  Aryna Sabalenka def.  Victoria Azarenka /  Ashleigh Barty, 7–5, 7–5

Mixed doubles

  Bethanie Mattek-Sands /  Jamie Murray def.  Chan Hao-ching /  Michael Venus, 6–2, 6–3

Junior boys' singles

  Jonáš Forejtek def.  Emilio Nava, 6–7(4–7), 6–0, 6–2

Junior girls' singles

  Camila Osorio def.  Alexandra Yepifanova, 6–1, 6–0

Junior boys' doubles

  Eliot Spizzirri /  Tyler Zink def.  Andrew Paulson /  Alexander Zgirovsky, 7–6(7–4), 6–4

Junior girls' doubles

  Kamilla Bartone /  Oksana Selekhmeteva def.  Aubane Droguet /  Séléna Janicijevic, 7–5, 7–6(8–6)

Wheelchair men's singles

  Alfie Hewett def.  Stéphane Houdet, 7–6(11–9), 7–6(7–5)

Wheelchair women's singles

  Diede de Groot def.  Yui Kamiji, 4–6, 6–1, 6–4

Wheelchair quad singles

  Andrew Lapthorne def.  Dylan Alcott, 6–1, 6–0

Wheelchair men's doubles

  Alfie Hewett /  Gordon Reid def.  Gustavo Fernández /  Shingo Kunieda, 1–6, 6–4, [11–9]

Wheelchair women's doubles

  Diede de Groot /  Aniek van Koot def.  Sabine Ellerbrock /  Kgothatso Montjane, 6–2, 6–0

Wheelchair quad doubles

  Dylan Alcott /  Andrew Lapthorne def.  Bryan Barten /  David Wagner, 6–7(5–7), 6–1, [10–6]

Wild card entries
The following players will be given wildcards to the main draw based on internal selection and recent performances.

Men's singles
  Ernesto Escobedo
  Christopher Eubanks
  Bjorn Fratangelo
  Marcos Giron
  Antoine Hoang
  Thanasi Kokkinakis
  Jack Sock
  Zachary Svajda

Women's singles
  Kristie Ahn
  Francesca Di Lorenzo
  Cori Gauff
  Caty McNally
  Whitney Osuigwe
  Diane Parry
  Samantha Stosur
  Katie Volynets

Men's doubles
  Maxime Cressy /  Keegan Smith
  Martin Damm /  Toby Kodat
  Robert Galloway /  Nathaniel Lammons
  Evan King /  Hunter Reese
  Thai-Son Kwiatkowski /  Noah Rubin
  Mitchell Krueger /  Tim Smyczek
  Nicholas Monroe /  Tennys Sandgren

Women's doubles
  Kristie Ahn /  Christina McHale
  Usue Maitane Arconada /  Hayley Carter
  Hailey Baptiste /  Emma Navarro
  Francesca Di Lorenzo /  Ann Li
  Abigail Forbes /  Alexa Noel
  Cori Gauff /  Caty McNally
  Whitney Osuigwe /  Taylor Townsend

Mixed doubles
  Hailey Baptiste /  Jenson Brooksby
  Jennifer Brady /  Denis Kudla
  Hayley Carter /  Jackson Withrow
  Kaitlyn Christian /  James Cerretani
  Danielle Collins /  Nicholas Monroe
  Bethanie Mattek-Sands /  Jamie Murray
  Christina McHale /  Ryan Harrison
  CoCo Vandeweghe /  Maxime Cressy

Qualifier entries 
The qualifying competitions took place at USTA Billie Jean King National Tennis Center was scheduled on August 19 – 23, 2019.

Men's singles 

  Elliot Benchetrit
  Santiago Giraldo
  Kwon Soon-woo
  Ilya Ivashka
  Evgeny Donskoy
  Egor Gerasimov
  Tobias Kamke
  Grégoire Barrère
  Chung Hyeon
  Jenson Brooksby
  Dominik Köpfer
  Guillermo García López
  Sumit Nagal
  Jannik Sinner
  Jiří Veselý
  Marco Trungelliti

Lucky losers
  Paolo Lorenzi
  Kamil Majchrzak

Women's singles 

  Elena Rybakina
  Magdalena Fręch
  Jana Čepelová
  Peng Shuai
  Johanna Larsson
  Caroline Dolehide
  Ana Bogdan
  Mariam Bolkvadze
  Denisa Allertová
  Harriet Dart
  Tímea Babos
  Richèl Hogenkamp
  Taylor Townsend
  Wang Xinyu
  Tereza Martincová
  Anna Kalinskaya

Lucky losers
  Paula Badosa
  Varvara Lepchenko
  Nicole Gibbs
  Priscilla Hon
  Kirsten Flipkens
  Wang Xiyu

Protected ranking
The following players were accepted directly into the main draw using a protected ranking:

 Men's singles
  Tomáš Berdych (PR 57)
  Steve Darcis (PR 90)
  Jozef Kovalík (PR 85)
  Vasek Pospisil (PR 73)
  Cedrik-Marcel Stebe (PR 95)
  Janko Tipsarević (PR 88)

 Women's singles
  Svetlana Kuznetsova (PR 102)
  CoCo Vandeweghe (PR 100)

Withdrawals 
The following players were accepted directly into the main tournament, but withdrew due to injury, suspension, or personal reasons:

Men's Singles
Before the tournament
  Kevin Anderson → replaced by  Paolo Lorenzi
  Juan Martín del Potro → replaced by  Denis Kudla
  Mackenzie McDonald → replaced by  Albert Ramos Viñolas
  Milos Raonic → replaced by  Kamil Majchrzak

During the tournament
  Borna Ćorić
  Thanasi Kokkinakis

Women's Singles
Before the tournament
  Amanda Anisimova → replaced by  Varvara Lepchenko
  Mona Barthel → replaced by  Kirsten Flipkens
  Catherine Bellis → replaced by  Zhu Lin
  Dominika Cibulková → replaced by  Svetlana Kuznetsova
  Beatriz Haddad Maia → replaced by  Marie Bouzková
  Anna Karolína Schmiedlová → replaced by  Paula Badosa
  Lesia Tsurenko → replaced by  Wang Xiyu
  Markéta Vondroušová → replaced by  Priscilla Hon
  Vera Zvonareva → replaced by  Nicole Gibbs

During the tournament
  Anett Kontaveit

Notes

References

External links

 
 

 
2019 ATP Tour
2019 in tennis
2019 WTA Tour
2019
August 2019 sports events in the United States
September 2019 sports events in the United States
2019 in American tennis
2019 in sports in New York City